Sphecosoma aurantiipes is a moth in the subfamily Arctiinae. It was described by Rothschild in 1911, and is found in Venezuela, Paraguay, and Bolivia.

References

Natural History Museum Lepidoptera generic names catalog

Moths described in 1911
Sphecosoma